The 2023 Campeonato Mato-Grossense de Futebol is the 81st edition of the Mato Grosso's top professional football league. The competition began on 21 January, and is scheduled to end on 8 April. Cuiabá are the defending champions.

Format
On the first stage, all ten teams play against each other in a round-robin format. The two worst teams are relegated, while the top two teams qualify straight to the semifinals, and the other four best-placed teams qualify to the quarterfinals.

In the quarterfinals, the 3rd place faces the 6th place, while the 4th place faces the 5th place in a two-leged fixture, with the best placed team playing at home in the last match. In the semifinals, the winner of the 3rd-6th place contest faces the 2nd place, while the winner of the 4th-5th place contest faces the 1st place, also on two-legged matches. The winners face each other in the Finals, also played on two legs.

Qualifications
The champion qualifies to the 2024 Copa do Brasil and 2024 Copa Verde. The best team who is not on Série D, Série B or Série C qualifies to the 2024 Série D.

Participating teams

First round

Standings

Results

Final stage

Quarterfinals
The Federação Matogrossense de Futebol published the dates of the matches on 7 March 2023.

First leg

Second leg

Semifinals

First leg

Second leg

Finals

Top scorers

References

Mato-Grossense
2023